Audris Rijo (born April 8, 1985) is a Dominican beauty pageant titleholder, professional model, actress, presenter and journalist. She represented her country at Miss Turismo Dominicana, Reinado Internacional del Café, and Nuestra Belleza Latina.

In 2013, Rijo became first runner-up of Nuestra Belleza Latina 2013. In 2015 she became the host of entertainment for Telemundo 47 New York. She also was the host of the morning show Acceso Total Nueva York.

Career

Rijo won the National Title of Miss Dominican Tourism 2009, and also Miss Elegance and Miss Culture.

In 2010 Rijo took part in the International Queen of Coffee pageant in Manizales, Colombia, where she won the title of Queen of the Waters and Perfect Face. She also won Queen of the Americas in Guatemala City, Guatemala.

Audris also works in the area of fashion design, she launched her line of children's bathing suits call "Kisses Audris Rijo by DM", a creation in collaboration with designer Diany Mota. The official presentation of the brand took place on June 8, 2014 during Kids Fashion Week NY, and featured her on the catwalk.

Currently, she works for Telemundo 47 New York. She is the host of Acceso Total Nueva York.

Nuestra Belleza Latina 2013

In 2011, Audris auditioned for the Univision’s reality show, Nuestra Belleza Latina. However, she took time off from her career to focus on other personal interests. Rijo returned to her career in 2013 and was first runner-up on Nuestra Belleza Latina. During the competition, she won the 50 Mas Bellos challenge and was featured among People en Español magazine's "50 most beautiful people of 2014". Audris Rijo finished as first runner-up. The eventual winner was Marisela Demontecristo of El Salvador. Since participating in Univision contract, Rijo has worked as a reporter for Univision and was a presenter on Premios Juventud. She also appeared on People en Español. She has made appearances on ¡Despierta América!, El Gordo y la Flaca, and Don Francisco.

NBL VIP "All★Star"- Nuestra Belleza Latina 2016

Audris  has been chosen by the fans to compete in the first ever "All★Star" season of Nuestra Belleza Latina, The season of Nuestra Belleza Latina 2016 will premiere on Sunday February 28, 2015, but on March 6, 2016 she was eliminated because she did not receive enough votes to continue in the competition.

Magazine/newspaper covers
 Mujer Unica
 El Especialito
 Universal
 L'Estilo magazine
 Eventos magazine
 El Mundo del ShowBiz
 Metro.pr
 People en Español
 Latin Show magazine
 All the Picture

Awards
She received the Model of the Year Award and Gruperos Latinos Show Awards 2014.

She was presented with a Dominican of the Year award by Senator Adriano Espaillat of the United States Senate.

References

External links
 
 Univision
 Telemundo
 Nuestra Belleza Latina
 Nuestra Belleza Latina Biografia
 NBL 2013 Official NBL Page

1985 births
Living people
Univision
Dominican Republic female models